Saint-André-lez-Lille (literally Saint-André near Lille; Dutch: Sint-Andries or Sint-Andries-Rijsel) is a commune in the Nord department in northern France. It is part of the Métropole Européenne de Lille.

Population

Heraldry

Twin towns – sister cities

Saint-André-lez-Lille is twinned with:
 Dormagen, Germany
 St Mary's Bay, England, United Kingdom
 Wieliczka, Poland

See also
Communes of the Nord department

References

Communes of Nord (French department)
Nord communes articles needing translation from French Wikipedia
French Flanders